, also known as Tip and Run! Pig Hoof Battle!, is a 1998 anime film. It is the sixth film based on the popular comedy manga and anime series Crayon Shin-chan. The film was released to theatres on April 18, 1998 in Japan.

Plot 
The story begins when a secret agent Orioke hides on a houseboat stealing a disk necessary to make a secret weapon from the airship of the secret society Pig's Hoof where the students of Futaba Kindergarten were dining. An airship of Pig's Hoof took boat with Orioke, Shinnosuke, Kazama, Masao, Nene and Bo.

From there Shinnosuke, Masao, Nene, Kazama and Bo go with the agent everywhere as hostages of the Pig's Hoof. Simultaneously, an SML agent goes to the children's homes collecting photos of them to recognize and rescue them. But when he reaches the Noharas, Misae with Himawari and Hiroshi follow him to Hong Kong to rescue their son. There they get the agent to take them with him and help him.

Meanwhile, Shinnosuke and his friends, who are kidnapped along with the houseboat, are captured in the Pig's Hoof airship.  Eventually, three executives of Pig's Hoof, Barrel, Blade, Mama and the leader, Mouse appear and insist Orioke to return the disk but Orioke refuses this. They decide to take Orioke and Shinnosuke to the headquarters of Pig's Hoof.

On the way to the headquarters, Orioke succeeds in letting Shinnosuke and his friends escape from the airship but she couldn't escape. Kin'niku and the Noharas who came to help Shinnosuke and others crash lands on the ground when the plane as being attacked by the airship of Pig's Hoof. The three walk to the Pig's Hoof headquarters. On the other hand, Shinnosuke and his friends start walking toward the place where people were, but the step was toward the Pig's Hoof headquarters.

Shinnosuke and his friends find a secret entrance of the laboratory of Dr. Obukuro and enter. But they get caught because of the surveillance camera, and they meet with Orioke again. Mouse takes the disk back and starts the computer, Buriburizaemon is projected on it. The plan of the mouse is to spread and conquer computer viruses around the world. In the meantime, Misae joins Shinnosuke and others.

In desperation, Dr. Obukuro invades Shinnosuke into the program to prevent the spread of computer viruses. Mouse opens a black hole-like entrance and orders him to go wild as much as he wants, but Himawari interferes with the operation of the computer.

Buriburizaemon wants to hear in Shinnosuke's words. So Shinnosuke begins to talk about "Buriburizaemon's Adventure". Buriburizaemon thanks Shinnosuke and disappeared from the program. On the other hand, the Orioke defeated Mama, and the computer virus gets deleted.

However, Mouse activates the self-destruct device at the headquarters. Kin'niku command everyone to evacuate the place. The airship carrying all of them tries to escape from the headquarters, but it is too heavy to climb because there are many people on board. At that time, when Shinnosuke saw an illusion of Buriburizaemon who pushed up the airship. When the airship safely left the headquarters, the illusion of Buriburizaemon slowly disappeared into the flames.
After finishing hard work, Kin'niku and Orioke, who were previously a couple, remarry and went on a picnic with the Nohara family. While everyone strangely says, "It was like someone pushed up the airship at that time," Shinnosuke draws a picture of Buriburizaemon and says "The Adventures of Buriburizaemon."

Cast 
 Akiko Yajima as Shinnosuke Nohara
 Miki Narahashi as Misae Nohara
 Keiji Fujiwara as Hiroshi Nohara
 Satomi Kōrogi as Himawari Nohara
 Kotono Mitsuishi as Orioke
 Tesshō Genda as Kin'niku
 Tarō Ishida as Mouse
 Kaneto Shiozawa as Buriburizaemon
 Kōichi Yamadera as Barrel
 Minori Matsushima as Mama
 Show Hayami as Blade
 Junpei Takiguchi as Dr. Obukuro
 Hiroshi Masuoka as Angela Ome
 Mari Mashiba as Toru Kazama
 Tamao Hayashi as Nene Sakurada
 Teiyū Ichiryūsai as Masao Sato
 Chie Satō as Bo Suzuki
 IZAM as himself
 Yoshito Usui as Cartoonist
 Rokurō Naya as Bunta Takakura (principal)
 Yumi Takada as Midori Yoshinaga
 Michie Tomizawa as Ume Matsuzaka
 Yūko Satō as Justice

Soundtrack 
The theme song of the movie is PURENESS. It is written by IZAM, composed by KUZUKI and sang by SHAZNA.

Staff 
 Original: Yoshito Usui
 Director: Keiichi Hara
 Screenplay: Keiichi Hara
 Storyboard: Keiichi Hara
 Character Design: Katsunori Hara
 Animation director: Katsunori Hara and Noriyuki Tsutsumi
 Setting design: Masaaki Yuasa
 Cinematography: Toshiyuki Umeda
 Music: Toshiyuki Arakawa and Shinji Miyazaki
 Producer: Hitoshi Mogi, Kenji Ōta and Takashi Horiuchi
 Production companies: Shin-Ei Animation, TV Asahi and ADK

See also
 List of Crayon Shin-chan films

References

External links
 
 

Films directed by Keiichi Hara
1998 anime films
Blitzkrieg! Pig's Hoof's Secret Mission
Toho animated films
Animated films set in Tokyo
Films set in Hong Kong
Films scored by Shinji Miyazaki